The Scout and Guide movement in São Tomé e Príncipe is served by
 the Associação dos Escuteiros de São Tomé e Príncipe, member of the World Organization of the Scout Movement
 the Associação Guias de São Tomé and Príncipe, association "working towards WAGGGS membership"

See also